Euxinastra is a genus of air-breathing land snail with a clausilium, a terrestrial pulmonate gastropod mollusk in the family Clausiliidae, the door snails.

Subgenera
 Euxinastra
 Euxinastra fartilis Loosjes 1963
 Euxinastra hamata (O. Boettger 1888) - type species
 Euxinastra sumelae Neubert 1993
 Odonteuxina
 Odonteuxina harchbelica Páll-Gergely 2010 
 Odonteuxina iberica (Roth 1850)

References

Clausiliidae